Midhope may refer to:
Midhope, collectively, in the Peak district, South Yorkshire, near Sheffield, UK:
Midhopestones, a village
Upper Midhope, a hamlet
Midhope Castle, tower house in Scotland
Mid Hope burn, a stream in Northumberland